Delia Reinhardt may refer to:
 Delia Reinhardt (diver)
 Delia Reinhardt (soprano)